Ini Kopuria (died June 1945) was a police officer from Maravovo, Guadalcanal, Solomon Islands who founded the Melanesian Brotherhood in 1925. He and the Bishop of Melanesia, the Right Reverend John Manwaring Steward, realised Ini's dream by forming a band of brothers (known in the Mota language as 'Ira Reta Tasiu') to take the Gospel of Jesus to the non-Christian areas of Melanesia.

The Anglican Church of Melanesia and Church of England commemorate Kopuria on their calendars of saints.

Ini is remembered in the Church of England with a commemoration on 6 June.

See also

Calendar of saints (Church of England)

References

External Links 
Material by and about the Melanesian Brotherhood from Project Canterbury
The Brothers: The Story of the Native Brotherhood of Melanesia, by Margaret Lycett 1935 account.

Solomon Islands Anglican missionaries
Members of Anglican religious orders
1945 deaths
20th-century Anglican deacons
Anglican saints
Year of birth missing
Solomon Islands police officers
Anglican missionaries in the Solomon Islands
People from Guadalcanal Province